The 1998 Duke Blue Devils football team represented the Duke University in the 1998 NCAA Division I-A football season. The team participated as members of the Atlantic Coast Conference. They played their homes games at Wallace Wade Stadium in Durham, North Carolina. The team was led by head coach Fred Goldsmith, who was fired after the end of the season.

Schedule

References

Duke
Duke Blue Devils football seasons
Duke Blue Devils football